Garyab (also Romanized as Garyāb) is a village in Pain Khaf Rural District, Sangan District, Khaf County, Razavi Khorasan province, Iran. At the 2006 census, its population was 151, in 38 families.

References 

Populated places in Khaf County